The 2013–14 season was the Panathinaikos' 55th consecutive season in Super League Greece.

They also competed in the Greek Cup.

During the 2012–2013 season, Panathinaikos' president Giannis Alafouzos, announced that there will be a major reduce at the teams budget because of the financial problems they had been facing. He also said, that the average wage of the players will not surpass 300.000 euros, except from one or two exceptions. Finally, He announced, that the previous season's largest contract, which is the contract of Jean-Alain Boumsong will not exist at the team and that some lower, but still too high for the next year's standards contracts, such as the contracts of Toché or Vitolo, a renew will be offered, but with a major reduce, bigger the 50%. Also, there are many players such as José Manuel Velázquez, Bruno Fornaroli and many others, who were informed by the team's head coach Giannis Anastasiou, that they were not in the coach's plans for the next season.

Players

Current squad

Transfers

In

Total spending:  265.000 €

Promoted from youth system

Out
 
Total income:  5.990.000 €

Expenditure:   5.725.000 €

Pre-season and friendlies

Competitions

Super League Greece

Regular season

League table

Matches

UEFA play-offs

League table

Matches

Greek Cup

Second round

Third round

Quarter-finals

Semi-finals

Final

Top goalscorers

Season statistics (only official games have included)

References

External links
 Panathinaikos FC official website

Panathinaikos
Panathinaikos F.C. seasons